St Andrews is a suburb in north-western Hamilton in New Zealand. One of its main features is an 18-hole golf course built on an old flood plain on the west bank of the Waikato River. This area was regularly flooded before the construction of the Karapiro HEP dam further up river.

Demographics

Saint Andrews had a population of 5,361 at the 2018 New Zealand census, an increase of 366 people (7.3%) since the 2013 census, and an increase of 210 people (4.1%) since the 2006 census. There were 1,929 households, comprising 2,562 males and 2,796 females, giving a sex ratio of 0.92 males per female, with 1,119 people (20.9%) aged under 15 years, 1,071 (20.0%) aged 15 to 29, 2,304 (43.0%) aged 30 to 64, and 870 (16.2%) aged 65 or older.

Ethnicities were 73.5% European/Pākehā, 23.3% Māori, 5.0% Pacific peoples, 11.1% Asian, and 2.4% other ethnicities. People may identify with more than one ethnicity.

The percentage of people born overseas was 19.4, compared with 27.1% nationally.

Although some people chose not to answer the census's question about religious affiliation, 49.9% had no religion, 35.5% were Christian, 1.2% had Māori religious beliefs, 2.7% were Hindu, 0.6% were Muslim, 0.9% were Buddhist and 1.8% had other religions.

Of those at least 15 years old, 861 (20.3%) people had a bachelor's or higher degree, and 771 (18.2%) people had no formal qualifications. 705 people (16.6%) earned over $70,000 compared to 17.2% nationally. The employment status of those at least 15 was that 2,190 (51.6%) people were employed full-time, 519 (12.2%) were part-time, and 204 (4.8%) were unemployed.

Education 
Hamilton Junior High School is a school catering for years 7-10. It has  students.

Hamilton North School is a special school catering for students with intellectual disabilities. It has  students.

Both these schools are coeducational. Rolls are as of

References

See also
 List of streets in Hamilton
Suburbs of Hamilton, New Zealand

Suburbs of Hamilton, New Zealand
Populated places on the Waikato River